Presidential elections were held in Kiribati on 4 July 2003, the second in six months after previous President, Teburoro Tito, had been removed from office by a motion of no confidence in the Parliament just a month after winning the February elections, and just a day into his new term. The Kiribati Court of Appeal ruled that the single day in office constituted a third term, barring him from standing in further elections in accordance with the constitution.

The result was a victory for Anote Tong, who defeated his brother Harry Tong by just under 4%.

Results

References

2003 07
Kiribati
Presidential election
2003